Robert Bannatyne Finlay, 1st Viscount Finlay,  (11 July 1842 – 9 March 1929), known as Sir Robert Finlay from 1895 to 1916, was a British barrister and politician who was Lord High Chancellor of Great Britain from 1916 to 1919.

Background and education
Finlay was born at Cherry Bank in Newhaven, Edinburgh, the son of William Finlay, a physician, and Ann, daughter of Robert Bannatyne. He was educated at the Edinburgh Academy and Edinburgh University, graduating in medicine in 1864.

Legal and political career
After entering Middle Temple as a student in 1865, Finlay was called to the bar two years later and built up a successful practice, becoming a Queen's Counsel in 1882. Three years later he was elected Liberal Member of Parliament for the Inverness Burghs, but broke with William Ewart Gladstone over Irish Home Rule and joined the Liberal Unionists in 1886. He lost his seat in 1892 but regained it three years later, the same year he was appointed Solicitor General and knighted.

In 1900, Finlay became Attorney General for England and Wales and also became President of the Edinburgh Sir Walter Scott Club, and gave the Toast to Sir Walter at the club's annual dinner. In November 1902 he was elected Lord Rector of Edinburgh University for three years, and the same month he was elected Treasurer of the Middle Temple for the ensuing year. For his services in representing the British Empire in a number of international legal arbitrations he was appointed GCMG in 1904, and the following year became a Privy Counsellor. However, in the 1906 general election he again lost his seat, and it was four years before he returned to Parliament as member for Edinburgh and St Andrews Universities.

One of his last official acts as Attorney General was to appoint his son, William Finlay, as the junior counsel to the Board of Inland Revenue, an appointment which provoked much negative comment.

Judicial career 
On 19 December 1916, Finlay became Lord Chancellor in Lloyd George's coalition government, being at the same time created Baron Finlay, of Nairn in the County of Nairn. It is generally thought that Finlay was a temporary appointment: Lloyd George excluded him from the War Cabinet and insisted that he forgo the £5,000 pension given to retired lord chancellors. He sat on the Woolsack for three years, and in 1919, on his retirement, was created Viscount Finlay, of Nairn in the County of Nairn on 27 March.

The following year he was appointed a British member of the Court of Arbitration at The Hague, and in 1921 was elected a Judge of the Permanent Court of International Justice established by the League of Nations. As a judge of the Permanent Court, he participated in the celebrated  Lotus case in  1927, where the Court, by a bare majority, laid down the "Lotus principle" that States may exercise extraterritorial jurisdiction i.e. they may apply their national laws beyond their own borders, in any case where this is not explicitly prohibited. Finlay himself dissented from the majority decision.

Finlay received the freedom of the Royal burgh of Nairn on 1 October 1902.

Family
Lord Finlay married Mary, daughter of Cosmo Innes, in 1874. She died in June 1911. Lord Finlay died in March 1929, aged 86, at his home in Kensington, London, and was buried at Nairn. He was succeeded in his titles by his son, William Finlay, later a Lord Justice of Appeal.

Cases 
 Cotman v Brougham [1918] AC 514
  Lotus case 1927 PCIJ series A No.9

References

External links 
 

People educated at Edinburgh Academy
Lord chancellors of Great Britain
Members of the Judicial Committee of the Privy Council
Members of the Parliament of the United Kingdom for Highland constituencies
Scottish Liberal Party MPs
Lawyers from Edinburgh
Alumni of the University of Edinburgh
Viscounts in the Peerage of the United Kingdom
1842 births
1929 deaths
Solicitors General for England and Wales
Attorneys General for England and Wales
Rectors of the University of Edinburgh
UK MPs 1885–1886
UK MPs 1886–1892
UK MPs 1895–1900
UK MPs 1900–1906
UK MPs 1910
UK MPs 1910–1918
UK MPs who were granted peerages
Members of the Parliament of the United Kingdom for Edinburgh and St Andrews Universities
Permanent Court of International Justice judges
Members of the Permanent Court of Arbitration
Liberal Unionist Party MPs for Scottish constituencies
Members of the Privy Council of the United Kingdom
Knights Grand Cross of the Order of St Michael and St George
British judges of international courts and tribunals
Conservative Party (UK) life peers
Unionist Party (Scotland) MPs
Barons created by George V
Viscounts created by George V
Politicians from Edinburgh